Wanda Yvette Sykes (born March 7, 1964) is an American stand-up comedian, actress, and writer. She was first recognized for her work as a writer on The Chris Rock Show, for which she won a Primetime Emmy Award in 1999. In 2004, Entertainment Weekly named Sykes as one of the 25 funniest people in America. She is also known for her roles on CBS' The New Adventures of Old Christine (2006–10), HBO's Curb Your Enthusiasm (2001–present), and ABC's Black-ish (2015–2022). She currently stars in the Netflix original series The Upshaws which premiered on May 12, 2021, with Kim Fields and Mike Epps, and has appeared in the HBO Max comedy series The Other Two, as well as playing Allegra Durado, a new, powerful, and "messy"-brained partner in a legal firm on Paramount+'s acclaimed The Good Fight.

Aside from her television appearances, Sykes has also had a career in film, appearing in Monster-in-Law (2005), My Super Ex-Girlfriend (2006), Evan Almighty (2007), and License to Wed (2007), as well as voicing characters in animated films such as Over the Hedge, Barnyard, Brother Bear 2 (all in 2006), Rio (2011), the subsequent films of the Ice Age franchise (2012-2016), and UglyDolls (2019).

Early life and family
Wanda Sykes was born in Portsmouth, Virginia. Her family moved to Maryland when she was in third grade. Her mother, Marion Louise (née Peoples), worked as a banker, and her father, Harry Ellsworth Sykes, was a U.S. Army colonel employed at the Pentagon.

Sykes' family history was researched for an episode of the 2012 PBS genealogy program Finding Your Roots With Henry Louis Gates Jr. Her ancestry was traced back to a 1683 court case involving her ancestor, Elizabeth Banks, a free white woman and indentured servant, who gave birth to a biracial child, Mary Banks, fathered by a slave, who inherited her mother's free status. According to historian Ira Berlin, a specialist in the history of American slavery, the Sykes family history is "the only such case that I know of in which it is possible to trace a black family rooted in freedom from the late 17th century to the present."

Sykes attended Arundel High School in Gambrills, Maryland, and went on to graduate from Hampton University, where she earned a Bachelor of Science degree in marketing and became a member of Alpha Kappa Alpha. After college, her first job was as a contracting specialist at the National Security Agency, where she worked for five years.

Career
Following a role with the National Security Agency (NSA), Sykes began her stand-up career at a Coors Light Super Talent Showcase in Washington, DC, where she performed for the first time in front of a live audience in 1987.

She continued to perform at local venues while at the NSA until 1992, when she moved to New York City. One of her early TV appearances was Russell Simmons' Def Comedy Jam in the early 1990s, where she shared the stage with Adele Givens, J. B. Smoove, D. L. Hughley, Bernie Mac, & Bill Bellamy. Working for the Hal Leonard publishing house, she edited a book entitled Polyrhythms – The Musician's Guide, by Peter Magadini.
Her first big break came when opening for Chris Rock at Caroline's Comedy Club.

In 1997, she joined the writing team on The Chris Rock Show and also made many appearances on the show. The writing team was nominated for four Emmys, and in 1999, won for Outstanding Writing for a Variety, Music, or Comedy Special.

Since that time, she has appeared in the films Pootie Tang and on TV shows such as Curb Your Enthusiasm. In 2003, she starred in her own short-lived Fox network sitcom, Wanda at Large. The same year, Sykes appeared in an hour-long Comedy Central special, Tongue Untied. That network also ranked her No. 70 on its list of the 100 greatest all-time stand ups. She served as a correspondent for HBO's Inside the NFL, hosted Comedy Central's popular show Premium Blend, and voiced a recurring character named Gladys on Comedy Central's puppet show Crank Yankers. She also had a short-lived show on Comedy Central called Wanda Does It.

In addition to her film and television work, she is also an author. She wrote Yeah, I Said It, a book of humorous observations on various topics, published in September 2004.

In 2006, she landed a recurring role as Barb, opposite Julia Louis-Dreyfus, on the sitcom The New Adventures of Old Christine; she became a series regular during the series' third season in 2008. She also guest starred in the Will & Grace episode "Buy, Buy Baby" in 2006. She provided voices for the 2006 films Over the Hedge, Barnyard, and Brother Bear 2. She had a part in My Super Ex-Girlfriend and after playing in Evan Almighty, had a bit part in License to Wed. Sykes's first HBO Comedy Special, entitled Wanda Sykes: Sick & Tired, premiered on October 14, 2006; it was nominated for a 2007 Emmy Award. In 2008, she performed as part of Cyndi Lauper's True Colors Tour for LGBT rights.

In October 2008, Sykes appeared in a television ad for the Think Before You Speak Campaign, an advertising campaign by GLSEN aimed at curbing homophobic slang in youth communities. In the 30-second spot, she uses humor to scold a teenager for saying "that's so gay" when he really means "that is so bad".

In March 2009, Sykes became the host of a late-night talk show on Saturdays on Fox, The Wanda Sykes Show which was scheduled to premiere November 7, 2009. In April 2009, she was named in Out magazine's "Annual Power 50 List", landing at number 35.

In May 2009, Sykes was the featured entertainer for the annual White House Correspondents' Association dinner, becoming both the first African American woman and the first openly LGBT person to get the role. Cedric the Entertainer had been the first African American to become the featured entertainer in 2005. At this event, Sykes made controversial headlines as she responded to conservative radio talk show host Rush Limbaugh's comments regarding President Barack Obama. Limbaugh, in reference to Obama's presidential agenda, had said "I hope he fails". In response, Sykes quipped: "I hope his [Limbaugh's] kidneys fail, how 'bout that? Needs a little waterboarding, that's what he needs."

Her second comedy special, Wanda Sykes: I'ma Be Me premiered on HBO in October 2009.
November 2009 saw the premier of The Wanda Sykes Show, which starts with a monologue and continues with a panel discussion in a similar format to Bill Maher's shows Real Time with Bill Maher and Politically Incorrect.

She appeared as Miss Hannigan in a professional theatre production of Annie at The Media Theatre in Media, PA, a suburb southwest of Philadelphia. Her first appearance in a musical, she played the role from November 23 to December 12, 2010, and again from January 12 to 23, 2011. She voices the Witch in the Bubble Guppies episode "Bubble Puppy's Fin-tastic Fairlytale Adventure".

In 2012, Sykes played the role of Granny in Blue Sky Studios' Ice Age: Continental Drift.  In 2016, she returned to the role in Ice Age: Collision Course.

In May 2013, Sykes was a featured entertainer at Olivia Travel's 40th anniversary Music & Comedy Festival in Punta Cana, Dominican Republic.

In 2013, Sykes appeared in eight episodes of Amazon's Alpha House, a political comedy series written by Doonesbury creator Garry Trudeau. Sykes plays Rosalyn DuPeche, a Democratic Senator from Illinois and the next door neighbor of four Republican senators living together in a house on Capitol Hill. Sykes also appeared in Season Two, which became available in October 2014. The series was canceled after the second season.

In 2018, Sykes became the head writer for the revived tenth season of Roseanne. This attracted attention due to star Roseanne Barr's history of controversial political remarks,. On May 29, 2018, Sykes announced on Twitter that she would no longer be working on the series after a since-deleted Twitter rant by Roseanne Barr about Valerie Jarrett.

In 2021, Sykes began starring on the Netflix sitcom The Upshaws. Sykes co-hosted the 94th Academy Awards with Regina Hall and Amy Schumer on March 27, 2022.

In January 2023, Sykes guest hosted The Daily Show after Trevor Noah's departure.

Personal life

Sykes was married to record producer Dave Hall from 1991 to 1998. In November 2008, she publicly came out as a lesbian while at a same-sex marriage rally in Las Vegas regarding Proposition 8. A month earlier, Sykes married her wife Alex Niedbalski, a French woman, whom she met in 2006. The couple also became parents in April 2009, when Niedbalski gave birth to a pair of fraternal twins, a daughter and a son, named Olivia and Lucas.

Sykes only came out to her conservative mother Marion and father Harry when she was 40, who both initially had difficulty accepting her homosexuality. They declined to attend her wedding with Alex, which led to a brief period of estrangement; they have since reconciled with Sykes.

During a September 19, 2011, appearance on The Ellen DeGeneres Show, Sykes announced that she had been diagnosed earlier in the year with ductal carcinoma in situ (DCIS). Although DCIS is a non-invasive "stage zero breast cancer", Sykes had elected to have a bilateral mastectomy in order to lower her chances of getting breast cancer. Sykes splits time between Media, Pennsylvania, a suburb of Philadelphia, and Cherry Grove, New York.

Activism
Sykes publicly expressed being devastated when California voters passed state Proposition 8. She said: "with the legislation that they passed, I can’t sit by and just watch. I just can’t do it." She has continued to be active in same-sex marriage issues hosting events and emceeing fundraisers. She has also worked with PETA on promoting dog anti-chaining legislation in her home state.

She has been an outspoken supporter of Detroit's Ruth Ellis Center after the organization's staff sent Sykes a letter asking her to visit during her 2010 tour's stop in Detroit.

Sykes often uses Twitter to express her political views, including on May 25, 2021 retweeting a photograph by Evan Vucci of Gianna Floyd, daughter of George Floyd, entering the White House. On July 17, 2021, she also tweeted, "Congress MUST pass the #ForThePeopleAct," and called on her followers to join the "Good Trouble Vigil," commemorating the passing of activist and Congressman John Lewis.

Awards
Sykes has been nominated for fourteen Primetime Emmys, with one win (in 1999) for "Outstanding Writing for a Variety or Music or Program." In 2001, she won the American Comedy Award for "Funniest Female Stand-Up Comic." She won a Comedy Central Commie Award for "Funniest TV Actress" in 2003. In 2010 she won the GLAAD Stephen F. Kolzak Award. In 2015 she won the Activism in the Arts honor at the Triumph Awards.

Filmography

Film

Television

Video games

Writer

Discography

References

External links

 
 
 
 What Happened Ms. Sykes?

1964 births
Living people
20th-century American comedians
20th-century American actresses
20th-century American women writers
21st-century American comedians
21st-century American actresses
21st-century American women writers
American television actresses
American film actresses
American voice actresses
African-American actresses
African-American stand-up comedians
African-American screenwriters
American stand-up comedians
Television producers from New York (state)
American women television producers
American television writers
American women comedians
Hampton University alumni
Late night television talk show hosts
American lesbian actresses
American lesbian writers
LGBT African Americans
American LGBT broadcasters
Lesbian comedians
Lesbian screenwriters
LGBT people from Virginia
LGBT television producers
American LGBT rights activists
American LGBT screenwriters
National Security Agency people
Primetime Emmy Award winners
Writers from Alexandria, Virginia
People from Portsmouth, Virginia
Actresses from Alexandria, Virginia
People from Gambrills, Maryland
People from Fire Island, New York
Screenwriters from Virginia
Screenwriters from New York (state)
Screenwriters from Maryland
American women television writers
African-American female comedians
20th-century African-American women writers
20th-century African-American writers
21st-century African-American women writers
21st-century African-American writers
Television producers from Virginia
American people of Tikar descent
American LGBT comedians